At the 2006 US Open, the winner of the girls' doubles competition was the team of Buzărnescu and Olaru, both from Romania, who were seeded second in the tournament.  The runners-up were Sharon Fichman and Anastasia Pavlyuchenkova, from Canada and Russia, respectively, who were seeded first. The other semifinalists were the teams of Kramperová and Vaňková, from the Czech Republic, and Klaffner and Paszek, from Austria. Neither of these teams had been seeded.

Seeds
 Sharon Fichman /  Anastasia Pavlyuchenkova (final)
 Mihaela Buzărnescu /  Ioana Raluca Olaru (champions)
 Julia Cohen /  Corinna Dentoni (second round)
 Kristina Antoniychuk /  Kristína Kučová (second round)
 Alexandra Dulgheru /  Urszula Radwańska (first round)
 Sorana Cîrstea /  Alexandra Panova (third round)
 Wing Yau Venise Chan /  Teliana Pereira (second round)
 Naomi Cavaday /  Dominice Ripoll (second round)

Draw

Finals

Top half

Bottom half

See also 

 2006 US Open (tennis)
 US Open (tennis)
 Junior tennis

References

External links 

Girls' Doubles
US Open, 2006 Girls' Doubles